Elophos dognini is a moth of the family Geometridae. It is found in Spain, France, Andorra, Switzerland and Italy.

The wingspan is 18–20 mm. Adults are on wing from June to August.

The larvae feed on various low-growing plants.

Subspecies
Elophos dognini dognini
Elophos dognini serotinoides Wehrli, 1922

References

External links
Lepiforum.de

Moths described in 1910
Gnophini
Moths of Europe